Lucerne, California may refer to:
Lucerne, Lake County, California
Lucerne Valley, California